Hellbound? is a 2012 Canadian documentary film which details the debate regarding various views about the existence and nature of hell.

Premise
The film features interviews of theologians and commentators who discuss various views whether Hell exists and if so, who would go there after death.

Interview subjects include:

Production
Producer Kevin Miller began active work on Hellbound? in January 2011. During the production work, discussion and controversy over the subject of Hell was raised by the release of Rob Bell's book, Love Wins.

Release
The first public screening of Hellbound was on 12 September 2012 in Nashville, Tennessee, followed by showings in other North American cities. The film was released on DVD and VOD on 28 May 2013.

Reception
, the review aggregator website Rotten Tomatoes indicated a 67% approval rating from critics.

References

External links
 
 

2012 films
English-language Canadian films
Canadian documentary films
Heaven and hell films
Documentary films about Christianity
2010s English-language films
2010s Canadian films